Tasso may refer to:

People
Torquato Tasso, Italian 16th-century poet, author of Gerusalemme liberata
Tasso, Lament and Triumph, a symphonic poem by Franz Liszt based on the poet
Torquato Tasso, a play by Goethe based on the life of the poet
Bernardo Tasso, his father, also a poet
Faustino Tasso, Italian monk and poet
Henri Tasso, French politician
Takuya Tasso, the governor of Iwate Prefecture in Japan
Tasso Jereissati, Brazilian politician
Tasso of Friuli, early 7th-century Lombard duke

Places
Tasso, Corse-du-Sud, a commune on Corsica, France
Tasso Island, in the Sierra Leone River
Tasso River, a river in Mumbai, India
Tasso, Tennessee, an unincorporated community in Bradley County, Tennessee
Tasso, Lumarzo, Genova, Liguria, Italy, a village (frazione) within the community (comune) of Lumarzo in Genoa province, Italy
Tasso, Benin, a town and arrondissement in Benin

Other uses
TASSO, the name of a particle detector and the group of physicists working with it
Tasso (horse), an American Thoroughbred racehorse
Tasso (meat product) or Tasso ham, a specialty of Cajun cuisine